The hairy-fronted muntjac or black muntjac (Muntiacus crinifrons) is a type of deer currently found in Zhejiang, Anhui, Jiangxi and Fujian in southeastern China. It is considered to be endangered, possibly down to as few as 5–10,000 individuals spread over a wide area. Reports of hairy-fronted muntjacs from Burma result from considering the hairy-fronted muntjac and Gongshan muntjac as the same species. This suggestion is controversial. It is similar in size to the common muntjac.

Hairy-fronted muntjacs are extremely difficult to study because of their shyness. Camera-trap photographs have revealed the presence of hairy-fronted muntjacs where they were believed not to have existed for decades, for example in the Wuyanling National Nature Reserve.

This species was for a very long time one of the most poorly known deer in the world. It was also considered highly endangered; up to 1975, it was only known from a few museum specimens, at least to western scientists. The species has been heavily hunted throughout the 20th century and in 1978 alone at least 2,000 animals were killed. The current population in China was assessed in the early 1990s to be about 10,000 individuals, however it has declined much since and the current population is likely to be well under 7,000.

See also
List of endangered and protected species of China

References 

hairy-fronted muntjac
Mammals of China
Endemic fauna of China
hairy-fronted muntjac
hairy-fronted muntjac